The Council of Indigenous Peoples (CIP), formerly known as the Council of Aboriginal Affairs, is a ministry-level body under the Executive Yuan in Taiwan (Republic of China). It was established to serve the needs of the country's indigenous populations as well as a central interface for the indigenous community with the government.

The Council promotes the use and revitalization of Taiwan's indigenous languages, supported legislation that would grant autonomous land to indigenous peoples, strengthened relations between Taiwan's indigenous groups and those in other countries and raised awareness of indigenous cultures. Among its responsibilities, it grants recognized status to indigenous peoples of Taiwan.

The council has been criticized by both indigenous and non-indigenous individuals and groups. These criticisms tend to accuse the Council of ineffectiveness, and of discriminating against plains indigenous peoples.

History 

The council was originally established on 1 December 1996 as the Council of Aboriginal Affairs. On 1 July 1999, the Aboriginal Affairs Commission of the Taiwan Provincial Government was incorporated into the council. The council also took over the management of the Indigenous Peoples Cultural Park from the commission. On 4 January 2002, the Legislative Yuan approved the amendments to the council and on 25 March in the same year, the council was renamed to Council of Indigenous Peoples.

Leadership 
As with all cabinet-level bodies under the Executive Yuan, the Council of Indigenous Peoples is headed by a minister who is recommended by the Premier and appointed by the President.

The first chairman of the Council of Aboriginal Affairs was Hua Chia-chi. He was succeeded in 2000 by Yohani Isqaqavut, a long-time indigenous rights activist, chief of general affairs at the Yushan College of Theology, and Presbyterian missionary. Yohani stepped down in 2002. His successor, Chen Chien-nien, had been Taitung County commissioner from 1993 to 2001, a position in which he became known for his dedication to improving the lives of indigenous peoples.

On 4 February 2005, Chen was indicted for electoral fraud. He was accused of buying votes for his daughter, Chen Ying, in the legislative election held three months prior. Chen denied the accusations, but he nevertheless resigned from his position as chairman. He was replaced by Walis Pelin. In 2007, Icyang Parod became chairman, and he was succeeded by Chang Jen-hsiang the next year. Chang was criticized by both indigenous people and legislators of all ethnicities. Indigenous protesters outside the Council building demanded Chang resign, saying that she had disregarded the land and hunting rights of indigenous peoples. Protesters claimed Chang allowed the Atomic Energy Council to dump nuclear waste near indigenous villages, and that the government would not let the Puyuma people participate in its traditional annual hunt without permission from the Forestry Bureau. Kao Chin Su-mei, an Atayal legislator, criticized Chang at the same time. Chang was later criticized by several other lawmakers, who questioned her effectiveness in her position, as well as her commitment to securing autonomy for indigenous peoples.

Sun Ta-chuan, an academic, became the chairman in 2009. He was succeeded in 2013 by Lin Chiang-yi, formerly the deputy minister of the council.

Tribal recognition 

Before the establishment of what was then called the Council of Aboriginal Affairs, there were nine indigenous peoples recognized by the government of Taiwan. These peoples had been classified by Japanese colonial authorities, and the designations were kept by the Taiwan government. In 2001 the Thao was recognized. The next year, Kavalan became the first plains indigenous people to be recognized. The Truku, who had previously been classified as Atayal, was recognized in 2004. This recognition was controversial, however; some Seediq, also classified as Atayal, did not consider the Truku to be distinct from them, and claimed that giving Truku separate status was a political move. In 2007, the Sakizaya, who had been classified as Amis, gained recognition. The Seediq were officially split from the Atayal in 2008. The most recent additions were in 2014, when both the Hla'alua and the Kanakanavu were recognized.

Pingpu
Among the Pingpu, or plains indigenous peoples, only the Kavalan have been officially recognized by the government. Unlike the "mountain" or "highland" indigenous peoples, Pingpu had been largely assimilated into Han society, and they typically lost official recognition as indigenous after the 1940s. Efforts to gain recognition for Pingpu peoples from the Council of Indigenous Peoples have been largely ineffective. Pingpu activists have called on the Council several times, but every time the council has a reason not to grant them recognition. In 2009, calls for recognition were denied on the ground that law only grant indigenous status to those whose parents were registered as indigenous peoples. The Council later said that plains indigenous peoples should have registered in the 1950s and 1960s and compared modern Pingpu seeking recognition to "the homeless beggar who kicked out the temple administrator," a Taiwanese analogy used to describe someone who attempts to displace something's rightful owner. The Council apologized for making the analogy, but activists refused to accept the apology. In 2010, after more dissatisfaction with the council, Pingpu activist Lin Sheng-yi called on the government to create a new ministry specifically for Pingpu affairs.

Struggles for autonomy 
Historically, one of the main goals of the Council of Indigenous Peoples has been securing autonomy for the indigenous peoples. When Yohani Isqaqavut was chairman, he worked towards securing land rights for Taiwan's indigenous people, saying "During my term, I will endeavor to see that indigenous land rights are respected." Despite autonomy being one of the most notable issues among indigenous peoples, many activists feel that the government of Taiwan has not made adequate progress. In 2010, ten years after the completion of the first draft bill on indigenous autonomy, it still had not passed. Sun Ta-chuan, Minister of the Council of Indigenous Peoples, said that a bill would be passed within two years. By September of that year, the Executive Yuan passed a bill, supported by Sun Ta-chuan. However, some indigenous activists were against the bill, claiming that the government did not accept input from indigenous activists when drafting the bill, autonomy would still be dependent on the approval of local governments. In November, activists said that, despite the bill, the Executive Yuan did not care about autonomy, as indigenous townships were to become districts in special municipalities, in which indigenous people would no longer have self-governance.

Other actions 
The Council of Indigenous Peoples has supported efforts to protect and revitalize the languages spoken by Taiwanese indigenous peoples. In 2001, the Council commissioned the first proficiency tests for indigenous languages in Taiwan. In 2005, the council established a romanized writing system for all Taiwanese indigenous languages. The annual exam later began to wane in popularity; in 2009, the proficiency test for the Thao, Saaroa, and Tona Rukai languages had no participants, and the passing rate of test-takers dropped five percent from the previous year. In 2013, the Council published an online dictionary of seven indigenous languages: Bunun, Saisiyat, Tsou, Truku, Thao, Kanakanavu, and Tao. The Council consulted with tribal elders, speakers of the languages, and linguists to create the dictionary. The council has recruited speakers of indigenous languages to study the rates of comprehension and use of those languages.

The Council of Indigenous Peoples has promoted international solidarity among indigenous peoples. The Council sponsored trip for a group of Taiwanese indigenous peoples to the 18th session of the UN-sponsored Working Group on Indigenous Populations in 2000. Besides political actions, the council has supported trade, economic cooperation, and cultural exchange with Canada's indigenous peoples and New Zealand's Māori people.

After the enactment of a 2000 law which required the Taiwanese government to either allocate time slots on public television to indigenous culture and education or to create a channel solely devoted to indigenous issues, the council began to push for a channel to be made. In 2005, the channel was finally created, becoming the first such channel in Asia. Indigenous producers criticized the channel, arguing that most of the programs were not produced by indigenous peoples.

The Council produced an anthology of indigenous literature, including poetry, prose, and short stories, and a history of Taiwanese indigenous literature since 1951, and promoted this anthology alongside other indigenous documents, such as historical documents and oral histories.

Criticism 
The council has come under fire for ineffectiveness. In 2002, the Executive Yuan reported that the Council created job service stations in areas with low concentrations of indigenous population, and that the stations were not effective in lowering unemployment. In 2008, indigenous legislators criticized the council for delaying legislative proposals.

In 2010, Jason Pan, director of the Taiwan Association for Rights Advancements for Plains Indigenous Peoples, wrote a letter to the United Nations on behalf of Pingpu rights groups, in which he asked the UN to investigate the refusal of the Taiwanese government, and specifically the Council of Indigenous Peoples, to recognize Pingpu as indigenous peoples.

Young indigenous activists criticized the council for a lack of transparency regarding a cross-strait service pact.

Organizational structures
 Department of Planning
 Department of Education and Culture
 Department of Health and Welfare
 Department of Economic and Public Construction
 Department of Land Management
 Bureau of Culture Park

Ministers
Political Party:

Access
The council building is accessible by Xinzhuang Fuduxin MRT station of the Airport MRT.

See also
 Executive Yuan
 Taiwanese indigenous peoples

Important News Articles
ROC Constitutional Court paves way for Siraya recognition

References

External links

1996 establishments in Taiwan
Executive Yuan
Government agencies established in 1996
Indigenous affairs ministries
Organizations based in New Taipei
Taiwanese aboriginal culture and history